Jean-Philippe Krasso (born 17 July 1997) is a professional footballer who plays as a forward for  club Saint-Étienne. Born in Germany, he plays for the Ivory Coast national team.

Club career

Early career 
Krasso moved to France in 2007 from Germany and starting playing football at IFR Châteauroux, before joining the academy of Lorient. He spent his early career with Lorient B, Schiltigheim, and Épinal in the Championnat National 2.

Saint-Étienne 
Krasso signed a three-year professional contract with Saint-Étienne on 28 May 2020. On 24 July 2020, he made his professional debut with Saint-Étienne in a 1–0 loss to Paris Saint-Germain in the 2020 Coupe de France Final. On 31 January 2021, he was loaned to Le Mans in the Championnat National, to progress his career. On 27 January 2022, Krasso was loaned to Ligue 2 side Ajaccio, and helped the club achieve promotion to Ligue 1.

On 30 August 2022, Krasso scored four goals in Saint-Étienne's 5–0 home victory over Bastia, becoming the first to score four goals in a league match for the club in the 21st century.

International career
Krasso was born in Germany and is of Ivorian descent, and moved to France at a young age. He represented the Ivory Coast U20s at the 2017 Toulon Tournament. He debuted with the senior Ivory Coast national team in a friendly 2–1 win over Togo national team on 25 September 2022.

Honours 
Saint-Étienne

 Coupe de France runner-up: 2019–20

References

External links
 
 
 

1997 births
Living people
Footballers from Stuttgart
Ivorian footballers
Ivory Coast international footballers
Ivory Coast under-20 international footballers
German footballers
German people of Ivorian descent
Association football forwards
FC Lorient players
SC Schiltigheim players
SAS Épinal players
AS Saint-Étienne players
Le Mans FC players
AC Ajaccio players
Ligue 1 players
Ligue 2 players
Championnat National players
Championnat National 2 players
Ivorian expatriate footballers
Ivorian expatriates in France
Expatriate footballers in France